Granite Calimpong (born 1982/83) is a Pacific Northwest glass artist. He received an undergraduate degree in Interdisciplinary Computing in the Arts at University of California San Diego in 2007. In 2013 he was artist-in-residence at Pittsburgh Glass Center for six weeks. Calimpong was a Master of Fine Arts candidate at University of Washington School of Art + Art History + Design as of 2018.

In July–August 2018, Calimpong was scheduled to be an instructor at Haystack Mountain School of Crafts.

His glass art is both blown and cold worked, and described as "form based".

References

External links

: Museum of Glass, Tacoma, Washington, December 3, 2016
: North Lands Creative Glass, Scotland, February 23, 2016

1982 births
Artists from Seattle
American glass artists
Living people
University of California, San Diego alumni
University of Washington School of Art + Art History + Design alumni